In ergodic theory, Kac's lemma, demonstrated by mathematician Mark Kac in 1947, is a lemma stating that in a measure space the orbit of almost all the points contained in a set  of such space, whose measure is , return to  within an average time inversely proportional to .

The lemma extends what is stated by Poincaré recurrence theorem, in which it is shown that the points return in  infinite times.

Application 
In physics, a dynamical system evolving in time may be described in a phase space, that is by the evolution in time of some variables. If this variables are bounded, that is having a minimum and a maximum, for a theorem due to Liouville, a measure can be defined in the space, having a measure space where the lemma applies. As a consequence, given a configuration of the system (a point in the phase space) the average return period close to this configuration (in the neighbourhood of the point) is inversely proportional to the considered size of volume surrounding the configuration. 

Normalizing the measure space to 1, it becomes a probability space and the measure  of its set  represents the probability of finding the system in the states represented by the points of that set. In this case the lemma implies that the smaller is the probability to be in a certain state (or close to it), the longer is the time of return near that state.

Where  is a characteristic time of the system in question.

In practice, as the variables needed to describe the system increase, the return period increases rapidly.

References

Further reading 
 
 
 
 

Ergodic theory
Lemmas